Centerville may refer to:

Centerville, Grant County, Wisconsin, an unincorporated community
Centerville, Manitowoc County, Wisconsin, a town
Centerville, St. Croix County, Wisconsin, an unincorporated community
Centerville, Trempealeau County, Wisconsin, an unincorporated community